$ is the second solo studio album by the Canadian garage rock/doo-wop musician Mark Sultan. The album was recorded in 2009 and released on April 13, 2010.

Track listing

References

2010 albums
Mark Sultan albums
Last Gang Records albums
Power pop albums by Canadian artists
Doo-wop albums